Porteria is a monotypic genus of South American intertidal spiders containing the single species, Porteria albopunctata. It was first described by Eugène Simon in 1904, and has only been found in Chile.

References

Desidae
Monotypic Araneomorphae genera
Spiders of South America
Taxa named by Eugène Simon
Endemic fauna of Chile